Ralph Stover State Park is a Pennsylvania state park on  in Plumstead and Tinicum Townships, Bucks County, Pennsylvania in the United States. It is a very popular destination for whitewater kayaking on Tohickon Creek and rock climbing on High Rocks (Triassic sandstone of the Newark Group). Ralph Stover State Park is two miles (3.2 km) north of Point Pleasant near Pennsylvania Route 32.

History
Tohickon Creek was named by the Lenape, some of the first inhabitants of the area. "To-Hick-Hanne" means "Deer-Bone-Creek". Ralph Stover State Park was the site of an 18th-century gristmill that was built on Tohickon Creek by the park's namesake, Ralph Stover. Remnants of the mill and mill race can still be seen near Tohickon Creek.

The Stover family gave their land to the Commonwealth of Pennsylvania in 1931. The recreational facilities were built during the Great Depression by the Federal Works Progress Administration created by U.S. President Franklin D. Roosevelt to provide work for the unemployed. Author James A. Michener donated the High Rocks area to the park in 1956. Although "High Rocks State Park" is listed in the United States Geological Survey Geographic Names Information System and the coordinates given in USGS GNIS are located here, it was never an official name according to the Pennsylvania Department of Conservation and Natural Resources or a separate park.

Recreation
High Rocks is a  sheer rock face, composed of smooth red Lockatong Formation argillite interspersed with friable Brunswick Formation shale. Since slippery and crumbly rock makes climbing somewhat difficult here, High Rocks is notable mostly to local climbers. Over sixty routes have been put up here over seventeen walls, with difficulties up to 5.12c/d and V7. Most are used for trad climbing and top roping, with some bouldering and sport routes present as well.

Tohickon Creek offers whitewater conditions for kayaking in the spring with the winter snow melt and several times a year when water is released from Lake Nockamixon. The creek is also a warm water fishery with smallmouth bass, sunfish, carp and catfish. The Pennsylvania Fish and Boat Commission also stocks  the creek with trout.

A hiking trail of  passes the millrace. There is a shaded picnic area along Tohickon Creek and a scenic vista at the top of High Rocks.

Nearby state parks
The following state parks are within  of Ralph Stover State Park:
Benjamin Rush State Park (Philadelphia County)
Bull's Island Recreation Area (New Jersey)
Delaware and Raritan Canal State Park (New Jersey)
Delaware Canal State Park (Bucks and Northampton Counties)
Evansburg State Park (Montgomery County)
Fort Washington State Park (Montgomery County)
Hacklebarney State Park (New Jersey)
Jacobsburg Environmental Education Center (Northampton County)
Neshaminy State Park (Bucks County)
Nockamixon State Park (Bucks County)
Norristown Farm Park (Montgomery County)
Spruce Run State Park (New Jersey)
Round Valley State Park (New Jersey)
Tyler State Park (Bucks County)
Voorhees State Park (New Jersey)
Washington Crossing State Park (New Jersey)

Climate

According to the Trewartha climate classification system, Ralph Stover State Park has a Temperate Continental climate (Dc) with hot summers (a), cold winters (o) and year-around precipitation. Dcao climates are characterized by at least one month having an average mean temperature ≤ , four to seven months with an average mean temperature ≥ , at least one month with an average mean temperature ≥  and no significant precipitation difference between seasons. Although most summer days are slightly humid at Ralph Stover State Park, episodes of heat and high humidity can occur with heat index values > . The average wettest month is July which corresponds with the annual peak in thunderstorm activity. Since 1981, the wettest calendar day was 6.91 inches (176 mm) on 08/27/2011. Episodes of extreme cold and wind can occur with wind chill values < . The average annual snowfall (Nov-Apr) is between 30 and 36 inches (76 and 91 cm), and the average snowiest month is February which corresponds with the peak in nor'easter activity.

Ecology

According to the A. W. Kuchler U.S. potential natural vegetation types, Ralph Stover State Park would have a dominant vegetation type of Appalachian Oak (104) with a dominant vegetation form of Eastern hardwood forest (25).

References

External links

  

Climbing areas of the United States
State parks of Pennsylvania
Protected areas established in 1931
Works Progress Administration in Pennsylvania
Parks in Bucks County, Pennsylvania